Francis Yunqing Lin is a Chinese linguist and professor at Beijing International Studies University. He is known for his critique of generative grammar.

Critique of universal grammar
In an article, published in Lingua, Lin tries to provide a refutation of universal grammar based on methodological grounds. He points out that the very method for discovering the grammar makes it impossible to discover any innate linguistic universals. 
John J. Kim (from San Francisco State University) and Tong Wu (from Central China Normal University) has replied to Lin's views.
Lin has published a reply to Kim's arguments.

References

External links
 What is really wrong with universal grammar

Living people
Year of birth missing (living people)
Linguists from China
Beijing International Studies University people
Alumni of the University of Oxford
Philosophers of linguistics
Philosophers of language
Alumni of the University of Essex
Academic staff of Beihang University
Academic staff of Beijing Normal University
Academics of Goldsmiths, University of London
Chinese computer scientists